Rona Dougall is a Scottish broadcast journalist and television presenter. She currently acts as a main anchor on STV's current affairs programme, Scotland Tonight.

Brought up in Lenzie, East Dunbartonshire, Rona attended Lenzie Academy, before graduating from the University of Edinburgh. Dougall's broadcasting career began at Radio Forth. She then went on to become Scotland Correspondent at Sky News for over fifteen years - being made redundant in 2011.

Three weeks after being made redundant from Sky, STV bosses offered Rona a job as a co-anchor on the soon-to-be launched Scotland Tonight, after she spotted a post on the Facebook page of STV News anchor, John MacKay.

She said: "John is a friend on Facebook and a couple of months ago he posted about this great new current affairs programme on STV. The show sounded right up my street and I phoned to see if they needed a reporter. They asked if I would be interested in presenting from the studio. I did a screen test and they offered me the job."

Rona first presented on the programme's second edition, on 25 October 2011, interviewing then-First Minister of Scotland, Alex Salmond. She usually presents the programme on Wednesday and Thursday night, although fills in on other editions in the absence of MacKay.

References

External links

Alumni of the University of Edinburgh
Living people
People from Lenzie
Scottish journalists
Scottish women journalists
British television presenters
British women television presenters
Sky News newsreaders and journalists
STV News newsreaders and journalists
People educated at Lenzie Academy
1966 births
British women television journalists